Luke Scott may refer to:

 Luke Scott (baseball) (born 1978), American baseball player
 Luke Scott (director) (born 1968), English film director
 Luke Scott (rugby league) (born 1974), Australian rugby league player